Joseph Zong Huaide (5 March 1920 – 5 January 2021) was a Chinese Roman Catholic Bishop of Roman Catholic Diocese of Shaanxi, China.

Biography
Zong was born in Sanyuan County, Shaanxi in March 1920. From 1935 to 1948 he studied at a Catholic church which is named "Jintongfang Little Catholic Church". He was ordained as priest on 5 June 1949. After the founding of the Communist State, the Roman Catholic was persecuted by the Communist government. He worked at home between 1961 and 1965. On 23 October 1985, he was approved by Pope John Paul II to be the Bishop of Sanyuan Diocese. On 9 August 1987, he was secretly consecrated bishop by Bishop of Tongyuan Roman Catholic Church Li Jingfeng. Some years later, he was recognized as bishop by the Chinese civil authorities. On 23 December 1997, he went to Rome and was received by Pope John Paul II. He died in Sanyuan in January 2021 at the age of 100.

References

1920 births
2021 deaths
Chinese centenarians
People from Xianyang
20th-century Roman Catholic bishops in China
Men centenarians